Kapohauola was a High Chiefess in ancient Hawaii, Chiefess of Hawaii island and Queen consort of Maui. She is mentioned in ancient legends and was also called Kualua. Samuel Kamakau mentioned her in his book Tales and Traditions of the People of Old.

Biography 
Kapohauola was a sister of Princess Kapohanaupuni of Hilo. This means that her parents were King Kahokuohua and his wife Hiʻikawaiula.

She was born around 1503. She married her nephew Kakae, King of Maui. Their son was famous King Kahekili I, who is also known as "Kahekili the Great". He impoverished his Kingdom and people by many war campaigns.

Kapohauola was a grandmother of beautiful Princess Keleanohoanaapiapi who is the main character of one ancient chant, and Kawaokaohele, who was the King of Maui.

She also married High Chief ʻEhu, son of the King Kuaiwa. She bore a son named ʻEhunuikaimalino, who was a Chief of Kona during the reign of Kauholanuimahu. He married Keana and Opaekalani and had a child called Paula (likely son).

Family tree

References

Royalty of Maui
Hawaiian legends
Hawaiian royal consorts
Royalty of Hawaii (island)